Charles Bernard Fenenbock (August 28, 1917 – August 10, 1998) was an American football player who starred in college at UCLA, and professionally in the Pacific Coast Professional Football League (PCPFL), the National Football League (NFL), the All America Football Conference (AAFC), and the Canadian Football League (CFL).  Notably he was a running back for the Detroit Lions in the NFL, and for the Los Angeles Dons in the AAFC where he led the league in numerous offensive categories.

Starring at UCLA 
A highly recruited multi sport athlete out of Pittsburg High School in Northern California, Fenenbock chose to play football at UCLA.

He starred as UCLA's single wing tailback in 1938 and 1939. He was celebrated for his exiting breakaway runs as well as for his passing skills.

On January 1, 1939 Fenenbock was named MVP in the inaugural Pineapple Bowl played in Honolulu.

Following the 1938 season he was named to several All American teams .

At UCLA Fenenbock played alongside such greats as Kenny Washington, Jackie Robinson, Woody Strode and Burr Baldwin.

Professional football 
In 1941 he starred with the San Diego Bombers in the Pacific Coast Professional Football League (PCPFL).

In 1942 he was the single wing tailback for the renowned Los Angeles Bulldogs in the PCPFL.

He was named MVP of the 1942 PCPFL All Star game.

Detroit Lions 
Fenenbock starred for the NFL Detroit Lions in 1943 and 1945. As the Lions single wing tailback Fenenbock finished near the top of NFL statistics in a number of categories.

He was named to several All Pro lists.  During the 1943 season Fenenbock played a big part in turning around Detroit's NFL franchise.

In 1944 Fenenbock starred for the acclaimed El Toro Marine Corps football team

In 1945 he returned from military to lead the Detroit Lions to an excellent season.

Los Angeles Dons 
In 1946 and 1947 Fenenbock played for the Los Angeles Dons in the newly formed All America Football Conference.

Led the AAFC in yards per carry in 1946 averaging a stunning 13.5 yards per carry and was second in yards per carry in 1947.

Fenenbock was the AAFC's top kick and punt returner 1946-1948.

With the Dons he played halfback in the new T-formation adopted by professional football.

Fenenbock was acclaimed, along with Buddy Young, as the AAFC's top speedster and  breakaway runner.

Famed Cleveland Browns coach Paul Brown called Fenenbock the player he most feared in the AAFC.

Chicago Rockets 
In 1948 Fenenbock was traded to the Chicago Rockets in the AAFC.

That year, he led the Rockets in most offensive categories. Fenenbock was the Rockets best player and had a spectacular game in his return to his hometown of Los Angeles to play the Dons.

Canadian Football League 
With the merger of the AAFC with the NFL in 1949 many AAFC stars jumped to the Canadian Football League. In 1949 Fenenbock started with the Edmonton Eskimos.

Fenenbock played his last season in 1950 with the Calgary Stampeders.

Other details 
His small stature, powerful build, and blazing speed meant Fenenbock would always carry the nickname Mighty Mouse.

In 2000 Fenenbock's son, Michael, published a book about him. Fireworks Every Time He Touches The Ball: A Chronicle of Chuck Fenenbock's Football Career. Maxfilms Publishing 2000.

Later career 
Following his playing days, Fenenbock became a successful coach. Most notably at:
St. Paul High School in Santa Fe Springs, California.
Anaheim Rhinos professional football team.
Hawaiian Warriors and the Portland Loggers Football Club in the Continental Football League

References 

1917 births
1998 deaths
American football running backs
Calgary Stampeders players
Detroit Lions players
Edmonton Elks players
UCLA Bruins football players
Players of American football from Oakland, California
Players of Canadian football from Oakland, California